DeCordova is a city in Hood County, Texas, United States. As of the US 2018 Population estimates it has a population of 3169.

History
DeCordova Bend Estates started being developed at the same time as the De Cordova Bend Dam in the late 1960s. The dam, built on the Brazos River to control the flow downstream, formed Lake Granbury. The new community was intended to serve as a weekend recreational getaway for residents of the Dallas/Fort Worth Metroplex. It has a recently renovated clubhouse, 27 holes of golf, marina, swimming pool, tennis, fitness center and other amenities. DeCordova was named after Jacob Raphael De Cordova, the land agent and colonizer. He was born in Spanish Town (near Kingston), Jamaica. De Cordova and Robert Creuzbaurqv compiled the Map of the State of Texas, first published in 1849.

The city of DeCordova incorporated on January 15, 2000, DeCordova was the first city in Texas to be incorporated after the turn of the century and claims the title of Texas' "Millennium City".

Demographics

City government
The city has a mayor–council form of government and all city residents are members of the DeCordova Bend Estates Owners Association and the DeCordova Bend Estates Country Club. The Granbury Independent School District serves area students. Students attend Acton Elementary, Acton Middle, and Granbury High school, all outside the city limits.

References

External links

Cities in Texas
Cities in Hood County, Texas
Granbury micropolitan area